Thomas Edward Brown (January 6, 1913 – June 3, 1990) was an American actor and model.

Biography
Brown was born in New York City, the son of William Harold "Harry" Brown and Marie Francis Brown. As a child model from the age of two years, Brown posed as Buster Brown, the Arrow Collar Boy and the Buick boy. Brown was educated at the New York Professional Children's School. He was carried on stage in his mother's arms when he was only six months old.

As an actor, he is probably best remembered for playing the title role in The Adventures of Smilin' Jack and as Gilbert Blythe in Anne of Green Gables (1934). Later he appeared on the television shows Gunsmoke, Mr. Adams and Eve, General Hospital and Days of Our Lives. He also had a recurring role as Lt. Rovacs in Mr. Lucky. 

He enlisted in the United States Army in World War II where in three years he rose from private to lieutenant serving in France as a paratrooper where he was awarded a French Croix de Guerre and a Bronze Star Medal. He was promoted to captain with the 40th Infantry Division. He served during the Korean War with the 40th Infantry Division where he reached the rank of lieutenant colonel.

Brown died in Woodland Hills, Los Angeles, aged 77.

For his contributions to the film industry, Brown was inducted into the Hollywood Walk of Fame in 1960, with a motion pictures star located at 1648 Vine Street.

Filmography

 The Hoosier Schoolmaster (1924) as Shocky Thompson (film debut)
 The Wrongdoers (1925) as Little Jimmy
 Syncopation (1929) as Bellhop (uncredited)
 The Lady Lies (1929) as Bob Rossiter
 Queen High (1930) as Jimmy
 The Famous Ferguson Case (1932) as Bruce Foster
 Fast Companions (1932) as Marty Black
 Tom Brown of Culver (1932) as Tom Brown
 Hell's Highway (1932) as Johnny Ellis
 Laughter in Hell (1933) as Barton
 Destination Unknown (1933) as Johnny
 Central Airport (1933) as Neil 'Bud' Blaine
 Three-Cornered Moon (1933) as Eddie Rimplegar
 Two Alone (1934) as Adam
 This Side of Heaven (1934) as Seth Turner
 The Witching Hour (1934) as Clay Thorne
 Judge Priest (1934) as Jerome Priest
 Anne of Green Gables (1934) as Gilbert Blythe
 Bachelor of Arts (1934) as Alec Hamilton
 Sweepstake Annie (1935) as Bill Enright
 Mary Jane's Pa  (1935) as King Wagner
 Black Sheep (1935) as Fred Curtis
 Annapolis Farewell (1935) as Morton 'Click' Haley
 Freckles (1935) as Freckles
 Gentle Julia (1936) as Noble Dill
 And Sudden Death (1936) as Jackie Winslow
 I'd Give My Life (1936) as Nickie Elkins
 Rose Bowl (1936) as Paddy O'Riley
 Her Husband Lies (1937) as 'Chick' Thomas
 Maytime (1937) as Kip Stuart
 Jim Hanvey, Detective (1937) as Don Terry
 That Man's Here Again (1937) as Jimmy Whalen
 The Man Who Cried Wolf (1937) as Tommy Bradley
 Navy Blue and Gold (1937) as Richard Arnold 'Dick' Gates Jr.
 In Old Chicago (1938) as Bob O'Leary
 Merrily We Live (1938) as Kane Kilbourne
 Goodbye Broadway (1938) as Chuck Bradford
 Swing That Cheer (1938) as Bob Potter
 The Storm (1938) as Jim Roberts - Bob's Brother
 The Duke of West Point (1938) as Sonny Drew
 Sergeant Madden (1939) as Albert 'Al' Boylan, Jr.
 Big Town Czar (1939) - Danny Daley
 Ex-Champ (1939) as Bob Hill
 These Glamour Girls (1939) as Homer Ten Eyck
 Oh Johnny, How You Can Love (1940) - Johnny Sandham
 Ma! He's Making Eyes at Me (1940) as Tommy Shaw
 Sandy Is a Lady (1940) as Joe Phillips
 Margie (1940) as Bret
 Hello, Sucker (1941) as Bob Wade
 Three Sons o' Guns (1941) as Eddie Patterson
 Niagara Falls (1941) as Tom Wilson
 Sleepytime Gal (1942) as Chick Patterson
 Hello, Annapolis (1942) as Bill Arden
 Let's Get Tough! (1942) as Phil
 There's One Born Every Minute (1942) as Jimmy Hanagan
 Youth on Parade (1942) as Bingo Brown
 The Payoff (1942) as Guy Norris
 The Adventures of Smilin' Jack (1943, Serial) as Jack Martin
 Buck Privates Come Home (1947) as Bill Gregory
 Slippy McGee (1948) as Father Shanley
 Duke of Chicago (1949) as Jimmy Brody
 Ringside (1949) as Joe O'Hara
 Operation Haylift (1950) as Tom Masters
 I Killed Wild Bill Hickok (1956) as Wild Bill Hickok
 Naked Gun (1956) as Sonny Glenn
 The Quiet Gun (1957) as John Reilly
 The Notorious Mr. Monks (1958) as Payson, Defense Attorney
 The Choppers (1961) as Tom Hart 
 Cutter's Trail (1970, TV) as Orville Mason (final film)

Television

 The Life and Legend of Wyatt Earp (1956-1958) as Bill Slocum/Frank Burroughs
 Mr. Adams and Eve (1957) as Harry (Episode: "You Can't Go Home Again")
 Circus Boy (1957) as Ned Bailey
The Lone Ranger (1957)
“Outlaws in Grease Paint,” as De Witt Faversham
 The Adventures of Jim Bowie (1958) as Jeff Purky 
 Have Gun - Will Travel (1958) as Bob Pelley 
 Sugarfoot (1959) as Sheriff Pete Rayle
 Perry Mason (1959) as Assistant District Attorney Jarvis 
 Colt .45 (1959) as Sheriff Frank Willis
 Mr. Lucky (1959-1960) as Lieutenant Rovacs 
 Gunsmoke (1959-1974) as Major/Ed O'Connor  
 Lassie (1960) as Joe Morgan 
 77 Sunset Strip (1961) as Lou Maxton 
 The Rifleman (1962) as Sheriff
 The Untouchables (1962) as Police Captain Bellows 
 General Hospital (1965) as Al Weeks #2 
 Mister Roberts (1966) as Admiral Morrison 
 Cimarron Strip (1967-1968) as Sheriff Phillips/Charlie Ives 
 The High Chaparral (1970) as Spokes 
 The Jeffersons (1975-1979) as Radio Announcer/Emcee 
 Ellery Queen (1976) as Marvin - The Broadcaster
 Days of Our Lives (1976) as Nathan Curtis

References

Further reading 
 Holmstrom, John (1996). The Moving Picture Boy: An International Encyclopaedia from 1895 to 1995, Norwich, Michael Russell, p. 58.
 Dye, David (1988). Child and Youth Actors: Filmography of Their Entire Careers, 1914-1985. Jefferson, NC: McFarland & Co., 1988, p. 28-29.

External links

 

1913 births
1990 deaths
20th-century American male actors
American male child actors
American male film actors
American male television actors
United States Army personnel of World War II
United States Army personnel of the Korean War
United States Army officers
United States Army soldiers 
Recipients of the Croix de Guerre (France)
Deaths from lung cancer in California
Male actors from New York City
Warner Bros. contract players